Psychologs  is a monthly Mental Health print magazine publishing in English Language in Delhi, India.  Editorial Board Members and mental health experts from various institutions/hospitals, throw light on various issues of mental health in detail through this country's only mental health magazine. The Magazine focuses on Mental health and wellbeing, and rights of the Mental Health patient in India.The magazine makes people aware by organizing programs on various psychological issues across the country. The magazine provides a platform for mental health professionals to share their knowledge, expertise and perspectives on various mental health topics with the general public through articles, interviews and column and magazine considered as an authentic source about mental health in India.

Circulation and Readership 
The magazine is available in both print and electronic versions. Print magazine monthly circulation is 150000 in India with 12.25 readers per magazine and electronic Magazine's monthly circulation is 20 Lakh.  Psychologs Magazine's directory for Mental health professionals and rehabilitation professionals is widely used in India.

Mental Health Wellbeing Awareness 
The magazine organises conferences, meetings and events to promote mental health and well-being.

References

External links
 Psychologs.com

Magazine articles
Mental health
Mental health in India
Psychological novels
Health magazines
Literature